Jan Osvald Pedersen (born 9 November 1962 in Middelfart, Denmark) is a former Speedway rider who became Speedway World Champion in 1991 after finishing runner-up in 1986 and in third place in 1988 behind fellow Danes Erik Gundersen and Hans Nielsen. He also won the Speedway World Pairs Championship in 1990 and 1991, both times partnered by Hans Nielsen.

Career
In 1983 Pedersen signed for the Cradley Heathens. His first British meeting heralded a five-point return in Birmingham's Second City individual Trophy on 18 March. His future had been plotted for Dudley Wood almost a year earlier when he was recommended to Heathens team manager Peter Adams by his countryman, Bent Rasmussen. The ensuing months brought three more clubs knocking on his door but in August, Pedersen publicly pledged his future to Cradley.

Pedersen finished his debut season with a 7.20 league average and Cradley's team total soared over 60-plus points as they won the British League again. The decision was then made by new manager Colin Pratt to loan the Dane out and he spent 1984 with Sheffield. Despite that season being marred by a broken arm, he did enough to convince Tigers' promoter Maurice Ducker that he was worth buying. However, Pratt refused to sell and Pedersen's return to Dudley Wood for 1985 saw the start of an uninterrupted 8-year stint with the club. Pedersen achieved success for club, country and individually. He picked up World Individual medals of bronze, silver and won the World Championship in 1991.

His speedway career was brought to a premature end in his testimonial year. Less than a fortnight after Pedersen's 10-year testimonial at Cradley, he crashed in Denmark and suffered a serious back injury and never raced competitively again. Since 1993 he has been doing some saloon car racing in Denmark and won a championship in his first season. He has also had one year spells as team manager with Oxford and promoter with Cradley when the Cradley team spent the 1996 season riding at Stoke.

In 1999, he raced in the 25th Anniversary meeting at Denmark's Vojens track. A series of competitive races were held involving old and current international stars, including Gary Havelock, Henrik Gustafsson and Jesper B. Monberg. Pedersen managed to win every one of his races in his first track return since his career-ending accident in 1992.

In 2012, he joined the Dudley Heathens Speedway team as their team coach. Dudley Heathens has roots with Cradley Heathens who currently ride at Perry Barr Stadium with the Birmingham Brummies.

World Final Appearances

Individual World Championship
 1985 -  Bradford, Odsal Stadium - 9th - 7pts
 1986 -  Chorzów, Silesian Stadium - 2nd - 13pts
 1987 -  Amsterdam, Olympic Stadium - 7th - 19pts
 1988 -  Vojens, Speedway Center - 3rd - 13pts
 1991 -  Göteborg, Ullevi - Winner - 15pts
* Pedersen qualified for the 1989 and 1990 World Final's but withdrew injured on both occasions.

World Pairs Championship
1990 -  Landshut, Ellermühle Stadium (with Hans Nielsen) - Winner - 43pts (24)
1991 -  Poznań, Olimpia Poznań Stadium (with Hans Nielsen / Tommy Knudsen) - Winner - 28pts (14)

World Team Cup
 1986 -  Gothenburg, Ullevi,  Vojens, Speedway Center and  Bradford, Odsal Stadium (with Hans Nielsen / Erik Gundersen / Tommy Knudsen / John Jørgensen) - Winner - 129pts (30)
 1987 -  Fredericia, Fredericia Speedway,  Coventry, Brandon Stadium and  Prague, Marketa Stadium (with Hans Nielsen / Erik Gundersen / Tommy Knudsen) - Winner - 130pts (32)
 1988 -  Long Beach, Veterans Memorial Stadium (with Hans Nielsen / Erik Gundersen / Tommy Knudsen / John Jørgensen) - Winner - 44pts (12)
 1991 -  Vojens, Speedway Center (with Hans Nielsen / Tommy Knudsen / Gert Handberg / Brian Karger) - Winner - 51pts (15)

Individual Under-21 World Championship
 1982 -  Pocking, Rottalstadion - 5th - 10pts
 1983 -  Lonigo, Pista Speedway - 12th - 5pts

References

1962 births
Living people
People from Middelfart Municipality
Danish speedway riders
Individual Speedway World Champions
Speedway World Pairs Champions
Speedway promoters
Cradley Heathens riders
Sheffield Tigers riders
Sportspeople from the Region of Southern Denmark